Snowshoe Lake is a lake in North Frontenac, Frontenac County, Ontario, Canada, and part of the Madawaska River drainage basin. The primary outflow is an unnamed creek to Sullivan Lake, and the lake's waters eventually flow via the Madawaska River into the Ottawa River.

See also
List of lakes in Ontario

References

Lakes of Frontenac County